Here is a list of notable people affiliated with Trinity College. It includes alumni, attendees, faculty, and presidents of the college.

Notable graduates and attendees

Academia 

 Charles McLean Andrews, Pulitzer Prize-winning historian and professor
 Jere L. Bacharach, professor emeritus, Department of History, University of Washington
 Steven Barkan, sociologist and chairperson of the Sociology department at the University of Maine
 Anthony Beavers, professor of philosophy, director of cognitive science at the University of Evansville
 Lisa E. Bloom, American cultural critic, educator and feminist art historian
 Harry McFarland Bracken, American philosopher and author.
 David R. Brown, former president of the Art Center College of Design
 John Collins Covell, educator, principal of the Virginia School for the Deaf and the Blind and West Virginia Schools for the Deaf and Blind
 Stephen Lloyd Cook, Professor of Old Testament Language and Literature at Virginia Theological Seminary
 Evan Dobelle, New England Board of Higher Education president and former Trinity president
 Louis Feldman, professor of classics and literature at Yeshiva University
 Jane Fernandes, former president designate of Gallaudet University
 Edward Miner Gallaudet, founder of Gallaudet University
 Tom Gerety, former Trinity president and president Amherst College 1994–2003, collegiate professor, New York University
 Michael Grossman, CUNY distinguished professor of economics and creator of the Grossman model in health economics
 Kenneth W. Harl, Tulane University professor, numismatist
 Walter Harrison, president of the University of Hartford and NCAA committee head
 Susannah Heschel, Dartmouth College's Eli Black professor of Jewish Studies
 J. C. Hurewitz, professor emeritus in the political science department at Columbia University
 Abner Jackson, minister and president of Trinity College and Hobart College
 Philip S. Khoury, Associate Provost and Ford International Professor of History, MIT
 Lloyd A. Lewis, theology professor at the Virginia Theological Seminary
 John H. Makin, economist and visiting scholar with the American Enterprise Institute
 Richard T. Nolan, philosophy and religion professor, writer, Episcopal Church Canon
 Robert B. Pippin, philosopher; director of Department of Social Thought, University of Chicago
 Hyam Plutzik,  Pulitzer prize finalist, poet, and Professor of English at the University of Rochester
 William C. Richardson, board director of Exelon,  former president of Johns Hopkins University, former director on the boards of: the Kellogg Company, the Bank of New York, CSX Corporation, and Mercantile Bankshares. former head of the Kellogg Foundation
 Barry P. Rosen, distinguished professor and chair, Department of Molecular Biology and Biochemistry, Wayne State University School of Medicine (1987–2009); distinguished professor and associate dean for Research and Graduate Programs, Florida International University Herbert Wertheim College of Medicine (2009–present). 
 Franz Schurmann, sociologist and historian
 Jim Shepard, author and professor of creative writing and film at Williams College
 Robert B. Stepto, professor of English and African-American studies, Yale University
 George W. Strawbridge, Jr., board member of Widener University (former adjunct professor), The Jockey Club, National Museum of Racing and Hall of Fame, National Steeplechase Association, Margaret Dorrance Strawbridge Foundation, Campbell Soup Co.
 Ilhi Synn, class of 1962, president of Keimyung University
 Neil Theobald, 10th president of Temple University
 William G. Thomas III, history professor at the University of Nebraska–Lincoln, 2016 Guggenheim Fellow

Architecture 

 J. Cleaveland Cady, architect, designer of the south range of the American Museum of Natural History in New York City
 Arthur Gilman, Boston architect
 William Harold Lee, movie theatre architect
 Benjamin Wistar Morris, III, architect
 Samuel Beck Parkman Trowbridge, New York City architect

Arts and entertainment 

 Peter Alsop, musician
 Arthur Everett Austin, Jr., former director of the director of the Wadsworth Atheneum and Trinity professor
 Richard Barthelmess, silent film actor, a founder of the Academy of Motion Picture Arts and Sciences, 1928 Best Actor nominee
 John Biddle, cinematographer
 Deborah Buck, artist, designer and gallery owner 
 Dudley Buck, composer
 Brian Byrne, mandolinist
 Max Coyer, artist
 Joseph Cross, actor
 Lesley Dill, artist
 Carroll Dunham,  American painter
 Jared Bradley Flagg, painter
 Gold Chains, electro rap musician 
 Ari Graynor, actor
 Patrick Greene, composer
 Stephen Gyllenhaal, film producer and director
 Chris Hogan, comedian
 Christopher Houlihan, concert organist
 Mike Kellin, actor
 Mel Kendrick, artist
 Shahvaar Ali Khan, Pakistani writer, singer-songwriter and composer
 Dave MacKay, Jazz pianist, singer-composer
 Mary McCormack, actor
 Will McCormack, actor
 Steven Newsome, arts administrator
 Katryna Nields, folk-rock musician
 Elizabeth Page, writer, director and filmmaker
 Joseph Payne, British/Swiss German harpsichordist, clavichordist, organist and musicologist
Rachel Platten, American singer and songwriter best known for her 2015 single "Fight Song" and who won a Daytime Emmy Award
 John Rose, organist
 Xavier Serbia, member of the boy band Menudo, financial commentator and syndicated columnist
 Christopher Seufert, documentary film producer and director, and photographer
 Kwaku Sintim-Misa, Ghanaian actor and comedian
 Cotter Smith,  stage, film, and television actor
 Ernie Stires, composer
 Allen Butler Talcott, landscape painter
 Richard Tuttle, postminimalist artist
 Ernst Vegelin, director of the Courtauld Gallery, London
 John Henry Willcox, organist
 Samuel Adams Wisner, rapper

Athletics 

 Jonah Bayliss, Major League Baseball player
 Robert "Bob" Blum (born 1928), Olympic fencer
 George Brickley, former Major League Baseball and National Football League player
 Paul Collins, former National Football League player
 Eric DeCosta, Executive Vice President and General Manager, Baltimore Ravens
 Dan Doyel, former Trinity men's basketball coach
 Moe Drabowsky, former Major League Baseball pitcher
 Kanzy Emad El Defrawy, Squash player
 Mickey Kobrosky, College Football Hall of Fame member, former NFL and MLB athlete
 Roger LeClerc, former National Football League player
 Bill MacDermott, professional football coach
 Jay Monahan, Class of 1993, commissioner of golf's PGA Tour
 Swede Nordstrom, football player
 Chuck Priore, former Trinity football coach
 Joe Shield, National Football League quarterback
 Aaron Westbrooks, Irish basketball player
 Jay Williamson, professional golfer, current member of the PGA Tour

Business and industry 
 Mike Maccagnan, general manager for the New York Jets
 Sam Kennedy, president of the Boston Red Sox
 Hans W. Becherer, former president and CEO of John Deere
 S. Prestley Blake, co-founder of the Friendly Ice Cream Corporation
 David Chang, New York City chef and restaurateur, on the 2010 Time "100 Most Influential People" list
 Thomas M. Chappell, co-founder and CEO of Tom's of Maine
 Martin W. Clement, 11th president of the Pennsylvania Railroad 
 William Pancoast Clyde, owner of the Clyde Steamship Company
 Robert Habersham Coleman, iron processing and railroad industrialist
 Thomas R. DiBenedetto, president of Boston International Group, owner of A.S. Roma and partner in  New England Sports Ventures
 Liz Elting, co-founder and co-CEO of TransPerfect
Kristine Belson, president of Sony Pictures Animation and Oscar-nominated film producer (The Croods)
 Francis R. Delano, banker
 George M. Ferris, investment banker and philanthropist, founder of Ferris Baker Watts
 David Gottesman, billionaire, member of the board of directors of Berkshire Hathaway
 John D. Howard, CEO of Irving Place Capital
 Thomas S. Johnson, former chairman and CEO of GreenPoint Financial Corp
 Raymond E. Joslin, CEO of CAD Sciences, former president of Hearst Entertainment and Syndication, former senior vice president of the Hearst Corporation
Alfred J. Koeppel (1932–2001), New York real estate developer
 Eileen Kraus (1938–2017), trailblazing woman banker and president of Connecticut National Bank
 Peter S. Kraus, CEO of AllianceBernstein and former co-head of the Investment Management Division at Goldman Sachs
 Mitchell M. Merin, former president and chief operating officer of Morgan Stanley Investment Management
 Danny Meyer, founder of Union Square Hospitality Group (Union Square Cafe, Gramercy Tavern, Eleven Madison Park, Tabla, Blue Smoke)
 James Murren, chairman of the board and chief executive officer of MGM Mirage
 Roy Nutt, founder of Computer Sciences Corporation and co-creator of FORTRAN
 Gunnar S. Overstrom, Jr., former vice chair of FleetBoston Financial
 Charles R. Perrin,  chairman of Warnaco, former chairman and CEO of Avon Products and former chairman and CEO of Duracell
 Michael J. Petrucelli, founder of Clearpath, Inc.
 Paul E. Raether, member and head of Portfolio Management Committee of KKR
 William C. Richardson, board director of Exelon; former president of Johns Hopkins University; former director on the boards of the Kellogg Company, the Bank of New York, CSX Corporation, and Mercantile Bankshares; former head of the Kellogg Foundation
 Thomas R. Savage, former CEO of American International Group
 Clarence D. Tuska, former director of patent operations of the Radio Corporation of America
 William Turner, board member, Ameriprise Financial, former president and co-CEO at Franklin Electronic Publishers, former dean of the Stony Brook University College of Business
 Camalia Valdés, president and CEO of Cerveceria India
 Ronald V. Waters III, president and chief executive officer of the LoJack Corporation
 Roger L. Werner, director, president and chief executive officer of the Outdoors Channel Holdings, Inc.; former chief executive officer and the chief operating officer of ESPN
 Matthew Prince, co-founder and CEO of Cloudflare

Government, law, and public policy

Elected officials 

 John Baptista Ash, former U.S. Representative for Tennessee
 William Shepperd Ashe, former U.S. Representative
Francisco L. Borges, former Connecticut State Treasurer
 Charles R. Chapman, former mayor of Hartford, Connecticut and served in both houses of the Connecticut legislature
 Percival W. Clement, 57th Governor of Vermont
 William R. Cotter, U.S. Representative for Connecticut 
 Isaac E. Crary, first elected U.S. Representative for Michigan
 Joseph J. Crisco,  Connecticut State Senator
Tilton E. Doolittle, Speaker of the Connecticut House of Representatives and Former United States Attorney for the District of Connecticut 
 Bob Ebinger, member of the Montana House of Representatives
 Arie Eliav, Israeli member of the Knesset
 John H. Ewing, member of the New Jersey General Assembly and the New Jersey Senate
 Frank Fasi, former mayor of Honolulu
 John Fonfara, Connecticut State Senator
 Rodney P. Frelinghuysen, U.S. Representative for New Jersey 
 Thomas L. Harris, former U.S. Representative for Illinois 
 Joan Hartley, Connecticut State Senator 
 Charles D. Hodges, former U.S. Representative for Illinois 
 Colin M. Ingersoll, former U.S. Representative for Connecticut 
 Barbara B. Kennelly, former U.S. Representative 
 Henry W. King, former politician from Ohio
 Robert L. King, former New York State Assemblyman, Monroe County Executive, and chancellor of the State University of New York
 James Kinsella, former mayor of Hartford, Connecticut
 Themis Klarides, Class of 1987, Deputy Minority Leader of the Connecticut House of Representatives
 George Logan (Connecticut politician)
 Henry McBride, fourth Governor of Washington State
 Thomas Joseph Meskill, former U.S. Representative 
 Robert F. Murphy, former Majority Leader of the Massachusetts House of Representatives and 59th Lieutenant Governor of Massachusetts
 William Anthony Paddon, former Lieutenant-Governor of Newfoundland and Labrador
 Robert Treat Paine, U.S. Representative for North Carolina
 Eddie Perez, former Mayor of Hartford, CT.
 James Phelps, former U.S. Representative for Connecticut 
 John S. Phelps, former Governor of Missouri 
 Christine C. Quinn, first female and first openly gay Speaker of the New York City Council
 Joseph F. Ryter, former U.S. Representative 
 Henry Joel Scudder, former U.S. Representative 
 Kevin Sullivan, former lieutenant governor of Connecticut and former vice president for community and institutional relations for Trinity
 Charles A. Sumner, former U.S. Representative from California 
 Jane Swift, Class of 1987, former acting governor of Massachusetts
 John T. Wait, former U.S. Representative for Connecticut
 James Wakefield, former U.S. Representative
 Joseph M. Warren, former U.S. Representative for New York
 Charles C. Van Zandt, 34th Governor of Rhode Island

Law
 George Bachrach, politician, attorney, and current professor at Boston University
 Joseph Buffington, Judge, United States Court of Appeals for the Third Circuit
 JoAnne A. Epps, American law professor, legal author, and Provost of Temple University
 Arthur Healey, Associate Justice of the Connecticut Supreme Court
 Bridget McCormack, Chief Justice of the Michigan Supreme Court
 Richard N. Palmer, Associate Justice of the Connecticut Supreme Court
 Thomas Richard Purnell, Judge, United States District Court for the Eastern District of North Carolina 
 Adam Streisand, trial lawyer
 Stanley A. Twardy, former United States Attorney for the District of Connecticut
 Christine S. Vertefeuille, Associate Justice of the Connecticut Supreme Court
 John L. Wodatch, Chief, Disability Rights Section, United States Department of Justice Civil Rights Division

Other political figures
 Paul H. Alling, first United States Ambassador to Pakistan 
 Michael A. Battle, Sr, Ambassador the U.S. mission to the African Union
 Michael Billington, LaRouche Movement activist
 Alfonso L. Carney, Jr, chairman of the Dormitory Authority of the State of New York and former CEO and corporate secretary for the Goldman Sachs Foundation
 Roderick Allen DeArment, former chief of staff for senate majority leader Bob Dole and former United States Deputy Secretary of Labor
 Eugene H. Dooman, American diplomat, drafted the Potsdam Declaration 
 Steve Elmendorf, political chief of staff and deputy campaign manager
 J. Michael Farren, Deputy White House Counsel in the Office of Counsel to the President under the 43rd President of the United States George W. Bush
 Julia Freedson, former director of The Watchlist on Children and Armed Conflict 
Joan R. Kemler, the first woman to serve as Connecticut State Treasurer (1986–87) 
 Jesse Lee, White House Director of Progressive Media & Online Response
 Debra Liang-Fenton, former executive director of the U.S. Committee for Human Rights in North Korea 
 Stanley J. Marcuss, former Deputy Assistant Secretary of Commerce
 Nguyen Xuan Oanh, former governor of the State Bank of Vietnam, and former Prime Minister of the Republic of Vietnam
 Neil Patel, former chief policy advisor to Dick Cheney and co-founder of The Daily Caller
 Michael J. Petrucelli, deputy director and acting director of US Citizenship and Immigration Services at the US Department of Homeland Security
 Henry Shelton Sanford, diplomat and city founder
 Robert Tome, American diplomat, physician, and writer
 Richard H. Walker, general counsel at Deutsche Bank and former director of the United States Securities and Exchange Commission Division of Enforcement
 Dov Zakheim, former government official and Trinity professor

Journalism and the media 

 Jay Allison, independent public radio producer and broadcast journalist
 Bill Bird, journalist and publisher
 Tucker Carlson, commentator, host of Tucker Carlson Tonight on Fox News
 George Crile III, former CBS News journalist
 Anna David, author, journalist and television personality
 Jon Entine, author and Emmy winning special segment journalist with NBC News
 Eli Lake, national security correspondent for The Daily Beast and  Newsweek Magazine
William F. LaPlante II, 5-time Emmy winner for ABC and CBS, founding Sr. Prod. of Satellite Newschannel (world's first all-live cable news network) writer Washington Post and UPI.
 Malcolm MacPherson, national and foreign correspondent for Newsweek magazine
 William K. Marimow, Pulitzer Prize winner, executive vice president and editor at The Philadelphia Inquirer 
 Colin McEnroe, columnist and radio personality
 Jim Murray, Pulitzer Prize–winning sportswriter for the Los Angeles Times
David North, chairperson of the international editorial board of the World Socialist Web Site 
 Steven Pearlstein, columnist for The Washington Post
 Len Reed, former L.A. Times staff writer and member of 2014 Pulitzer Prize-winning editorial team of The Oregonian, Portland. 
 Robert William St. John, author, broadcaster and journalist
 David Sarasohn, columnist and managing editor of the Portland Oregonian, formerly a professor of US history at Reed College
 Caroline Taylor, actor and journalist
 Walter S. Trumbull, sportswriter
 Jesse Watters, Class of 2001, host of Watters' World and The Five; television producer; and on-air interviewer (Fox News)
 Linda Wells, founder and editor-in-chief at Allure magazine
 George Will, Pulitzer Prize-winning newspaper columnist, author, and ABC News political journalist

Literature and publishing 

 Edward Albee, playwright, three-time Pulitzer Prize Winner (expelled, honorary degree, 1974)
 Stephen Belber, associate writer of the Laramie Project
 Park Benjamin, Sr., poet and publisher
 Henry Howard Brownell, poet and historian.
 Michelle Cliff, poet and former Trinity professor
 Matthew Dicks, author
 Richard Eberhart, poet and former Trinity professor
 Patrice Evans, author 
 Patricia Fargnoli, poet
 Charles L. Grant, novelist and short story writer
 Ward Just, author
 James Longenbach, critic and poet
 George Malcolm-Smith, novelist and jazz musicologist
 Helen Curtin Moskey, poet
 Greg Potter, former comic book writer best known for co-creating the DC Comics series Jemm, Son of Saturn
 Tom Santopietro, best-selling author and Broadway theater manager
 Patricia Roth Schwartz, poet, playwright, and editor
 Joanna Scott, author and professor
 Parveen Shakir, poet and former Trinity professor
 Chase Twichell, poet, professor, and publisher

Medicine 
 Louis Aronne, physician, obesity specialist and author
 Robert Epstein, psychologist, researcher and writer
 James Hughes, bioethicist
 Mark Josephson, cardiologist and medical text writer
 James Ewing Mears, surgeon and former president of the American Surgical Association
 John S. Meyer, physician 
 D. Holmes Morton, physician and Albert Schweitzer Prize for Humanitarianism recipient
 William Anthony Paddon,  physician and Lieutenant-Governor of Newfoundland 1981–1986
 Edward Hazen Parker, physician and poet
 Joseph O. Prewitt Díaz, psychologist

Military 
 Donn F. Porter, Medal of Honor recipient
 Jon A. Reynolds, United States Air Force Brigadier General and former Vietnam War prisoner of war
 Griffin Alexander Stedman, Union Army Colonel in the U.S. Civil War
 Strong Vincent, Civil War soldier
 E. Donald Walsh, thirty-sixth Adjutant General of the State of Connecticut
 J. H. Hobart Ward, American Civil War general
 James H. Ward, first officer of the United States Navy killed during the American Civil War
 George A. Woodward, Brigadier General in the United States Army

Religion and theology 

 James Roosevelt Bayley, archbishop
 Eben Edwards Beardsley, theologian and clergyman
 John W. Beckwith, second bishop of Georgia
 Clement Moore Butler, Episcopal clergyman who served as chaplain of the Chaplain of the United States Senate
* Edmond La Beaume Cherbonnier, professor and scholar, founder of Religion Department
 Arthur Cleveland Coxe, second Episcopal bishop of New York
 Robert Duncan, bishop
 Thomas Gallaudet, priest, pioneer of deaf education in the United States
 Alfred Harding, second Episcopal bishop of Washington
 Samuel Hart, American Episcopal clergyman
 Francis L. Hawks, former priest and professor of divinity at Trinity
 Mark Hollingsworth, Jr., 11th bishop of the Episcopal Diocese of Ohio 
 Alexander Jolly, bishop of Moray, Ross and Caithness in the Scottish Episcopal Church
 David Buel Knickerbacker, third Protestant Episcopal bishop of the diocese of Indiana
 Rev. James A. Kowalski, current dean of the Cathedral of St. John the Divine
 Christie Macaluso, American prelate of the Roman Catholic Church
 John James McCook, chaplain and theologian
 Ian A. McFarland, Lutheran theologian, 43rd Regius Professor of Divinity at the University of Cambridge
 John Mason Neale, Anglican divine and scholar
 William Woodruff Niles, A.B. 1857, professor of Latin, 1864–70, Episcopal Bishop of New Hampshire, 1870–1914
 Horatio Potter, bishop and former Trinity professor
 John E. Sanders, evangelical Christian theologian and free-will theist
 Henry Winter Syle, minister in the Episcopal Church
 Thomas Hubbard Vail, first Episcopal Bishop of Kansas
 Lemuel H. Wells, bishop
 John Williams, eleventh Presiding Bishop of the Episcopal Church in the United States

Science, mathematics, and engineering 

 William Bowie, geodetic engineer

 Russell Doolittle, biochemist
 A. E. Douglass, astronomer who discovered a correlation between tree rings and the sunspot cycle
 Dean Hamer, Chief of Gene Structure and Regulation, National Institutes of Health and discoverer of the controversial gay gene and God gene
 Eric Fossum, physicist and engineer
* Ernest de Koven Leffingwell, geologist and Arctic explorer
 Christian Sidor, biologist and paleontologist, curator of vertebrate paleontology in the Burke Museum of Natural History and Culture and Biology Professor at the University of Washington
 Ernest Henry Wilson, botanist
 Bill Zeller, computer programmer, creator of the MyTunes application

Other 

 Harold Brooks-Baker, financier, journalist and publisher
 Verner Clapp, librarian
 Katharine Seymour Day, historic preservationist
Foster Gunnison Jr., gay rights activist and archivist
 Caroline Hewins, first female graduate of Trinity College, librarian
Charles J. Hoadly, Connecticut State Librarian from 1855 to 1900.
 Kara Kennedy, daughter of U.S. Sen Edward M. Kennedy (transferred)
* Kelly Killoren Bensimon,  author, jewelry designer and former editor of Elle Accessories
 Sally E. Pingree, philanthropist
 Isaac Toucey (former Trustee at Trinity), former Secretary of the Navy, Attorney General of the United States and the 18th Governor of Connecticut.
 Alexander Trachtenberg, activist for the Socialist Party of America

Faculty 
 Paul Assaiante, men's squash and tennis coach
 Ciaran Berry, poet and professor of English
 Sarah Bilston, British author and professor of English literature
 Xiangming Chen, dean of the Center for Urban and Global Studies 
* Edmond La Beaume Cherbonnier, Professor (Emeritus) of Religion
 Michelle Cliff, former professor of English
 George B. Cooper, former professor of history
 Leslie Desmangles, Charles A. Dana Research Professor of Religion and International Studies
 George Washington Doane, former professor of belles-lettres
 Richard Ebeling, former Shelby C. Davis Visiting Professor in American Economic History and Entrepreneurship
 Samuel Eliot, former Trinity president and professor
 William W. Ellsworth, former professor of law and 30th Governor of Connecticut
 Michael C. FitzGerald, professor of fine arts
 Rebecca Goldstein, former philosophy professor
 Robert Hillyer, poet and former professor of English
 James J. Hughes, sociologist and bioethicist teaching health policy
 Drew Hyland, professor of philosophy at Trinity
 Mark Jackson, former director of football  for the Oakland Raiders and former assistant football coach Trinity
 Gary Jacobson, former professor of political science
 James F. Jones, president of Trinity College
 Samuel Kassow, Jewish history professor and historian
 Charles Lemert, social theorist and sociologist, visiting professor of sociology
 Michael Lerner, former professor of philosophy
 Reinhard H. Luthin, visiting professor of history
 Elmer Truesdell Merrill, Latin scholar and former Trinity professor
 Stephen Minot, novelist and short story author
 Frank Gardner Moore, Latin scholar and former Trinity professor
 Okey Ndibe, professor of English teaching fiction and African literature
 Jon O. Newman, United States Federal Judge and former instructor at Trinity College
 Hugh Ogden, poet and former professor of creative writing 
 Stewart O'Nan, former writer-in-residence and professor of English
 Robert Bromley Oxnam, former professor of Asian history and former president of the Asia Society
 Gregory Anthony Perdicaris, former Ancient Greek professor and first U.S Consul to Greece
 Fred Pfeil, former English professor and literary critic
 Vijay Prashad, George and Martha Kellner Chair in South Asian History and professor of international studies
 Steven Pressman, former professor of economics
 David Rosen, literary scholar, recipient of the 2013 James Russell Lowell Prize from the MLA
 Barry R. Schaller, visiting lecturer in public policy
 Odell Shepard, former professor of English and lieutenant governor of Connecticut
 Mark Silk, professor of religious studies, author
 Edward Stringham, associate professor of American business and economic enterprise

Presidents of the college
 Joanne Berger-Sweeney 2014–present - 22nd president
 James Fleming Jones, Jr. 2004–2014 - 21st president
 Borden Winslow Painter, Jr. '58, H'95 2003–2004 - 20th president
 Richard H. Hersh 2002–2003 - 19th president
 Ronald R. Thomas H'02 - acting president 2001–2002
 Evan Samuel Dobelle H'01 1995–2001 - 18th president
 Borden Winslow Painter, Jr. '58, H'95 - acting president 1994–1995
 Tom Gerety 1989–1994 - 17th president
 James Fairfield English, Jr. H'89 1981–1989 - 16th president
 Theodore Davidge Lockwood '48, H'81 1968–1981 - 15th president
 Albert Charles Jacobs H'68 1953–1968 - 14th president
 George Keith Funston 1945–1951 - 13th president
 Authur Howard Hughes M'38, H'46 - acting president 1943–1945, 1951–1953
 Remsen Brinckerhoff Ogilby 1920–1943 - 12th president
 Henry Augustus Perkins - acting president 1915–1916, 1919–1920
 Flavel Sweeten Luther '70, H'04 1904–1919 - 11th president
 George Williamson Smith H'87 1883–1904 - 10th president
 Thomas Ruggles Pynchon '41 1874–1883 - 9th president
 John Brocklesby, acting president 1874
 Abner Jackson '37 1867–1874 - 8th president
 John Brocklesby, acting president 1866–1867
 John Barrett Kerfoot H'65 1864–1866 - 7th president
 Samuel Eliot H'57 1860–1864 - 6th president
 Daniel Raynes Goodwin 1853–1860 - 5th president
 John Williams '35 1848–1853 - 4th president
 Silas Totten 1837–1848 - 3rd president
 Nathaniel Sheldon Wheaton 1831–1837 - 2nd president
 Thomas Church Brownell 1824–1831 - 1st president

References 

Trinity College (Hartford) people
Trinity College (Connecticut)